The Life and Loves of Tschaikovsky or It Was a Lovely Night at the Ball is a 1939 German historical drama film directed by Carl Froelich and starring Zarah Leander, Aribert Wäscher and Hans Stüwe. The film portrays the fictional relationship between the Russian composer Pjotr Iljitsch Tschaikowsky and an aristocratic woman who, unhappily married, falls in love with him and decides to secretly support his work financially. It premiered on 13 August 1939 at the Venice Film Festival.

It was shot at the Tempelhof Studios in Berlin. The film's sets were designed by the art director Franz Schroedter.

Cast

References

Bibliography

External links 
 

1939 films
Films of Nazi Germany
German musical drama films
German biographical drama films
1930s musical drama films
1930s biographical drama films
1930s German-language films
Films directed by Carl Froelich
Films set in Russia
Films set in the 1860s
Films based on Hungarian novels
Films about classical music and musicians
Films about composers
Cultural depictions of Pyotr Ilyich Tchaikovsky
German black-and-white films
1930s historical musical films
German historical musical films
Films shot at Tempelhof Studios
UFA GmbH films
1939 drama films
1930s German films